Trumaine Johnson may refer to:
Trumaine Johnson (cornerback), American football cornerback
Trumaine Johnson (wide receiver), American football wide receiver